Ectopatria plinthina is a moth of the family Noctuidae. It is found in Western Australia.

External links
Australian Faunal Directory

Moths of Australia
Noctuinae
Moths described in 1909